Feast of Love is a 2007 American drama film directed by Robert Benton, and starring an ensemble cast that includes Morgan Freeman, Greg Kinnear, Radha Mitchell, Billy Burke, Selma Blair, Alexa Davalos, Toby Hemingway, and Jane Alexander. The film, based on the 2000 novel The Feast of Love by Charles Baxter, was first released on September 28, 2007, in the United States.

Plot
The movie deals with love and its many permutations, set within a community of friends in Portland, Oregon. Harry Stevenson, a local community college professor, provides narration throughout the film about how love can affect one's life.

Bradley

Bradley runs a small cafe in Portland. He has been married to his wife Kathryn for six years. Their marriage becomes strained when Kathryn begins a lesbian affair with Jenny, whom she meets playing softball. She leaves Bradley. The divorce affects him greatly, but he soon finds love again with Diana, a real estate agent who has a history with a married man named David. Though she ends her affair with David to marry Bradley, they ultimately declare they are in love with each other and Diana leaves Bradley, again devastating him. Now twice divorced, Bradley suffers an emotional breakdown and stabs himself in the hand. As his hand is being sutured at  the hospital, he falls for his doctor, Margit. In the film's conclusion, the two are revealed to marry.

Oscar and Chloe

Oscar is a young man working at Bradley's cafe who soon meets and falls in love with a girl named Chloe. However, Oscar is revealed to be living with his alcoholically abusive father, Bat. When Chloe visits a fortune-teller, she is told that Oscar will die. Chloe, though upset at first, straightens her resolve about her love for Oscar and their future together. Coming home, she urges Oscar to marry her immediately. At the wedding, Chloe reveals to Harry that she is pregnant, and plans to have another baby right after due to Harry's advice of having "two." In the film's conclusion everybody gathers for an afternoon in the park. While playing football, Oscar collapses; despite an attempt to get him to a hospital, congested traffic interferes, and he dies of a heart defect. Bat attempts to avenge his son's death by harming Chloe but Harry scares him off, and then asks Chloe if he and his wife Esther can 'adopt' her as their own.

Diana and David

Diana is a successful realtor and has been carrying on an affair with the married David. Though she asks him numerous times to leave his wife of 11 years, Karen, he cannot bring himself to do it. Their relationship becomes even more volatile when Diana begins dating Bradley and falls in love with him. David insists he loves Diana, but is unable to leave his wife. Diana marries Bradley and ends her affair with David. However, their love is later rekindled when Karen discovers her husband was cheating, leaving him. Free at last, David and Diana have an emotional confrontation in the park that ends with a kiss that Oscar and Chloe happen to see (and viewers can assume they tell Bradley), fueling their divorce and Bradley stabbing himself. In the film's conclusion Diana and David are shown as a public and functionally happy couple.

Harry and Esther

Harry and his wife Esther have been married a long time. Harry is a patron at Bradley's cafe and often provides the younger generation with advice on love. However, it is revealed that Harry and Esther are masking their own grief after the death of their adult son, Aaron. Harry reveals the nature of his son's death to Chloe, whom he and Esther grow very close to. Harry has also been struggling with the decision of going back to work as a professor at a university. In the film's conclusion, after Oscar's death, Harry and Esther offer to adopt a now widowed and pregnant Chloe, who tearfully accepts their offer.

Cast
Morgan Freeman as Harry Stevenson
Greg Kinnear as Bradley Smith
Radha Mitchell as Diana Croce
Billy Burke as David Watson
Selma Blair as Kathryn Smith
Alexa Davalos as Chloe Barlow
Toby Hemingway as Oscar Gamlen
Jane Alexander as Esther Stevenson
Fred Ward as Bat Gamlen
Stana Katic as Jenny
Erika Marozsán as Dr. Margit Vekashi
Margo Martindale as Mrs. Maggarolian

Production
While many of the movie's scenes are set at Portland State University, the nearby campuses of Western Seminary and Reed College were the actual locations of filming.  Locations at Reed include the Blue Bridge, the front lawn and Eliot Circle.  Scenes in the Jitters Cafe, owned by Kinnear's character, were filmed at the Fresh Pot at the corner of N Mississippi Avenue and Shaver streets in Portland.

Asked if Radha Mitchell needed any coaxing for the full frontal fight sequence where she and her married lover have at it, Robert Benton replied: "Not at all. Radha wanted to do a second take, and I thought, 'Are you insane?' I've learned when an actor says, let's go again, to do it. There's a little moment when she's smoking after lovemaking, and they're laughing together. I had nothing to do with that scene, except saying 'Action' and 'Cut.'"

Critical reception
The film received mixed reviews from critics. , it holds a 39% approval rating on the review aggregator Rotten Tomatoes, based on 117 reviews with an average rating of 5.29/10. The website's critics consensus reads: "Though beautifully photographed, Feast of Love offers little beyond a trite, melodramatic character drama." Metacritic reported the film had an average score of 51 out of 100, based on 28 reviews.

In his lukewarm review, Roger Ebert stated, "No movie can be very good that contains Fred Ward's worst performance (it's the fault of the character, to be sure)."

Box office performance
In its opening weekend, the film grossed US$1.7 million in 1,200 theaters in the United States and Canada, ranking #12 at the box office. It grossed a total of US$5.4 million worldwide – US$3.5 million in the United States and Canada and US$1.9 million in other territories.

References

External links

2007 films
Films set in Portland, Oregon
Films shot in Portland, Oregon
American LGBT-related films
Lesbian-related films
Bisexuality-related films
Female bisexuality in film
2000s English-language films
Films directed by Robert Benton
Lakeshore Entertainment films
2000s romance films
Metro-Goldwyn-Mayer films
Films scored by Stephen Trask
Films produced by Gary Lucchesi
2000s American films